(referred to as OniSuki for short) is a Japanese seinen manga series written and illustrated by Kouichi Kusano which was serialized on Futabasha's Web Comic High! service from August 2008 to September 2016. It has been licensed in North America by Seven Seas Entertainment. It has been adapted by Zexcs into an anime series which aired in Japan between January 9, 2011 and March 27, 2011. An additional original video animation (OVA) episode has also been released. A character song CD and a mini CD soundtrack was adapted from the anime.

Plot
Nao Takanashi loves her brother Shūsuke despite the incest taboo. Nao thinks that Shūsuke is her blood relative, but in fact she is an adopted daughter, whose parents have died. After Nao learns the fact, she wants to fall in love normally with Shūsuke because siblings by adoption can marry under the family law in Japan. However, she finds herself competing with Shūsuke's childhood friend, Iroha Tsuchiura, and his class president and yaoi lover, Mayuka Kondō.

Characters

Main

Nao is the adopted daughter of the Takanashi family and secretly loves her foster brother Shūsuke, going as far as to know everything about him to an obsessive degree. Ten years ago, she was in a car accident which killed her parents and caused her to lose her memory, and she has only recently learned the truth. She goes to various lengths to try to attract Shūsuke attention including throwing out his non-incest porn. She becomes particularly annoyed with other girls who try to get close to him. Her real name is never mentioned and her current name is the same as her deceased biological mother.

Shūsuke is the son of the Takanashi family. He is rather perverted, owns a large number of porn magazines and is always looking for panty shot opportunities. Recently he has started using the term "not betraying Nao" implying he loves her, or at least wishes to have her see him as a good older brother. He does admit to having some romantic interest in Nao. He is not aware of Nao's knowledge of either the truth about their relationship or the fact she knows about all his dirty habits. He is a heavy sleeper and Nao has to wake him up for school, not that she minds because it allows her the opportunity to do things she normally wouldn't if he was awake, in short this is when she shows her true self.

Iroha is Shūsuke's childhood friend from before Nao's adoption. Having played 'doctor' with him a lot as a child (which was Shūsuke's excuse to see her naked), she claims to be Shūsuke's lover and constantly makes advances towards him. She is also something of a stalker, watching him in his house through a telescope and using night vision goggles to stalk him. She is even called a "Genuine Stalker" due to her very detailed reports of Shūsuke's late night actions and activities. She is in constant competition with Nao over Shūsuke's affections, though they occasionally work together when someone else catches his eye. Oddly, despite the fact she has openly stated she is willing to have sex with Shūsuke, and even initiating the first move, he seems to not want this. It is hinted this may be due to his believing that his actions made her this way.

Shūsuke's classmate and class president, with a strong interest in Boy's Love magazines. When Shūsuke tears up one of her magazines by accident, she makes him her 'pet'. She forces him to purchase and review explicit BL magazines which she interprets as having a shared interest. Despite Shūsuke's belief that she may ask him to do something more perverted at some point, she treats him more as a boyfriend - making him bentos and coming to wake him up in time for school. Over time her feelings for Shūsuke increase because of his apparent acceptance of her BL magazines. She becomes attracted to Shūsuke's pink and sensitive nipples due to the fact she has never seen a naked man before, though despite him being her pet, she doesn't use this to her advantage. Although she confesses that she has feelings of wanting to dominate Shūsuke, she loses memory of the incident after being hit by a truck.

Others
,  and 

In the anime, it is implied that Keiichirō may have homosexual feelings towards Shūsuke, though this is only his delusion due to the trauma he has developed by being forced to read BL books.

Shūji is Shūsuke's father from whom he seems to have inherited his perverted nature. He took Nanaka to a porn movie on their first date and later attempts to 'confiscate' one of his son's magazines.

Nanaka is Shūsuke's mother who always sees her son as a perverted child.

Hirono is Nao's friend who questions why both Iroha and Nao love Shusuke.

Haruka is Nao's friend.

A fictional character from a little sister-themed eroge that Shūsuke has and who often shows up in his perverted dreams, usually those brought on by near death experiences.

A home tutor hired to help Shūsuke study for his exams. Her methods are a bit extreme, as she enforces a limit on Shūsuke's masturbation to get him to focus on his studies. She appears to have feelings for her own brother.

Anime original characters

She is a cosplayer who goes under the alias 'Princess Leila' and is very into her roleplay, suggesting she has a very loose grasp of reality. She seemingly makes a move on Shūsuke, dubbing him 'her saviour', and puts him through many strange trials, which are later revealed to train him to act out a warrior role in a cosplay event.

Ran's older twin sister. She is often annoyed by her sister, who often calls her 'Clone'. Although she initially appears to help Nao stop Ran's crazy plans, it is later revealed that she is a lesbian who has become interested in Nao's lips as well as seems to have a harem of girls after her attention. In the end, she accidentally kisses Iroha and takes a liking to her instead.

Media

Manga 
The original manga, written and illustrated by Kouichi Kusano, began serialization on Futabasha's Web Comic High! service from August 29, 2008. The serialization finished in September 2016 with a total of twelve released volumes. Seven Seas Entertainment released the manga in North America from August 2012 to March 2019.

Audio CDs 
A character song CD, entitled , was released on March 13, 2011, by Starchild Records. The CD contains one disc consisting of eleven different short tracks, and the disc length in entirety is five minutes and thirty nine seconds. Also, the Oniichan no Koto Nanka Zenzen Suki Janain Dakara ne!! DVD comprising all twelve episodes of the anime also includes a bonus CD containing the opening and ending theme songs, and their off vocal versions.

Anime 
Oniichan no Koto Nanka Zenzen Suki Janain Dakara ne!! has been adapted by Zexcs into a 12-episode anime television series, which aired in Japan on Chiba TV network between January 9, 2011 and March 27, 2011. The television airing includes many censor bars obscuring dozens of panty shot scenes each episode in the shape of the penguin and cat mascots for the show, which are removed for the Blu-ray versions of the episodes. The anime was directed by Keitaro Motonaga.

An additional OVA episode was included on the final Blu-ray volume, released on July 13, 2011.

Episode list

OVA

References

External links
 Web Comic High! 
  
  
  
 
 

2008 manga
2011 anime television series debuts
2011 Japanese television series endings
2011 anime OVAs
Futabasha manga
Harem anime and manga
Incest in anime and manga
Japanese webcomics
Seinen manga
Seven Seas Entertainment titles
Webcomics in print
Zexcs